Leanin' on Slick is a studio album by American rapper Aceyalone. It was released on Decon in 2013. The music video for the title track was filmed in Cuba and directed by Jason Goldwatch.

Critical reception
Thomas Quinlan of Exclaim! gave the album a 7 out of 10 and described it as "a fun, funky feel-good album for the summer." Logan Smithson of PopMatters gave the album 5 stars out of 10, saying, "It's probably easier to appreciate Leanin' on Slick if you're older or a die-hard fan of Aceylone, but it's probably not a great album no matter what angle you're listening from."

AllMusic named it as one of their "Favorite Hip-Hop/Rap Albums of 2013".

Track listing

References

External links
 

2013 albums
Aceyalone albums
Decon albums